Frances Elaine Newton ( McLemore; April 12, 1965 – September 14, 2005) was executed by lethal injection in the state of Texas for the April 7, 1987 murder of her husband, Adrian, 23, her son, Alton, 7, and daughter, Farrah, 21 months.

Forgery conviction 
In December 1985, Newton was sentenced to three years of probation for forgery.

Details of killings

All three victims were shot with a .25 caliber pistol which belonged to a man that Newton had been seeing at the time. Newton claimed that a drug dealer killed the three. The Houston police presented evidence that Newton's husband was a drug dealer and was in debt to his supplier. Newton maintained her innocence from her first interrogation in 1987 until her execution in 2005.

Three weeks before the slayings, Newton had purchased life insurance policies on her husband, her daughter, and herself. These were each worth $50,000. She named herself as beneficiary on her husband's and daughter's policies. Newton claimed she forged her husband's signature to prevent him from discovering that money had been set aside to pay the premiums. Prosecutors cited these facts as the basis for her motive.

Newton was also found to have placed a paper bag containing the murder weapon in a relative's home shortly after the murders. On October 25, 1988, Newton was convicted of the murders and sentenced to death; she spent nearly 17 years on death row before finally being executed by lethal injection on September 14, 2005.

Death row

Two hours before her first scheduled execution on December 1, 2004, Texas Governor Rick Perry granted a 120-day reprieve to allow more time to test forensic evidence in the case. There were also conflicting reports as to whether a second gun was recovered from the scene; ballistics reports appeared to demonstrate that a gun recovered by law enforcement and allegedly connected to Newton after the offense was the murder weapon. A relative of Newton who was incarcerated shortly after the murders claimed a person he shared a cell with boasted of killing the family. Numerous individuals, including three members of the convicting jury, expressed concern over evidence that was not presented during the trial.

On August 24, 2005, the Texas Court of Criminal Appeals turned down a motion for a stay of execution. It turned down another appeal on September 9 for writ of habeas corpus. It was her fourth application.
The Texas Board of Pardons and Paroles voted 7–0 on September 12 not to recommend that her sentence be commuted to life imprisonment, despite evidence raising doubt about her guilt and a letter from her husband's parents asking that her life be spared. The same day the United States Court of Appeals for the Fifth Circuit refused an appeal of her sentence. 

Her new attorney, David Dow, asked Governor Perry for a 30-day stay to prove that Newton was wrongly linked to the murder weapon. The Supreme Court of the United States declined without dissent two appeals on September 13.

Execution

The execution was carried out as scheduled on September 14, 2005 by lethal injection. Frances Newton spent a little more than 17 and a half years on death row before her execution, and was the third woman executed in Texas since the resumption of capital punishment in the state in 1982. The first and second were Karla Faye Tucker and Betty Lou Beets.
Like Beets before her, Newton made no final statement and did not have a last meal request.

Newton's story was featured in the Fatal Attraction episode, "A Lethal Love". It is the seventeenth episode of the program's third season. It has also been featured on Deadly Women. Newton also appeared as herself in the 2006 television documentary "Women on Death Row", where her guilt is put into question and her innocence was discussed before she was executed.

See also 

 Capital punishment in Texas
 Capital punishment in the United States
 List of people executed in Texas, 2000–2009
 List of people executed in the United States in 2005
 List of women executed in the United States since 1976

General references
 
 
 Report from National Coalition to Abolish the Death Penalty
 Report from Texas Moratorium Network
 Last Statement. Texas Department of Criminal Justice. Retrieved on 2007-11-15.
 Frances Elaine Newton. The Clark County Prosecuting Attorney. Retrieved on 2007-11-15.

References

1965 births
2005 deaths
20th-century African-American women
21st-century African-American women
21st-century executions by Texas
21st-century executions of American people
American female murderers
American murderers of children
American people executed for murder
Executed African-American people
Executed American women
Familicides
Murderers for life insurance money
People convicted of murder by Texas
People executed by Texas by lethal injection
People from Houston